Mark Schulman (unknown – unknown), was a Canadian chess player.

Biography
In the 1960s Mark Schulman was one of the leading Canadian chess players He participated many times in Canadian Chess Championships and achieved the best result in 1965, when he shared 4th place.

Mark Schulman played for Canada in the Chess Olympiad: 
 In 1968, at second reserve board in the 18th Chess Olympiad in Lugano (+2, =4, -2).

In 2018, in Winnipeg took place Mark Schulman Memorial chess tournament.

References

External links

Year of birth missing
Year of death missing
Canadian chess players
Chess Olympiad competitors
20th-century chess players